Mubarik Ali Shah Gillani (August 15, 1936– May 15, 2021 in Lahore) was a Pakistani Sufi religious leader of the Qadiriyya tariqa (order). He was the founder of The Muslims of America and also founded the International Qur'anic Open University. 

With full titles his name appears as El-Sheikh Syed Mubarik Ali Shah Gillani Hashimi.

Early life
Gilani is the eldest son of Pir Maqsood Shah Gilani and his family were the caretakers and custodians of Mian Mir shrine in Lahore.

International Quranic Open University
The International Qur'anic Open University is a premier institute for the intensive, in-depth study of the Quran, Islamic traditions and Sufic Sciences with a strong emphasis on the upholding and practice of the Quran and Sunnah.

The Muslims of America
The Muslims of America, Inc. was founded in 1980 by Gilani during his seven years in the United States during which he sought to establish Islam in America. Among other projects it has communities in the Town of Hancock, New York, called Islamberg and in York County, South Carolina, called Holy Islamville. A community in California, called Baladullah, existed from 1989 to 2002. Hancock is where Jamaat ul-Fuqra is said to be headquartered.

Publications
In 1978, Gilani published An Introduction to Quranic Psychology, which detailed, according to him, proofs upon scientific evidence and witnessing about using the Qur'an (Koran) and religious observance to cure certain mental disorders.  This was followed up by his An introduction to psychiatry: based on teaching of the Quran and also contains results of scientific demonstration of curing incurable mental diseases in the Psychiatric Institute, Taif, Saudi Arabia, 1976–1977 published in 1981.

In 1983 he published an edited and revised edition of Rauzatus-Safa, an influential 15th Century history volume set beginning with the creation of the Jinn and Adam all the way up to the Temurid dynasty of Islamic history. Rauzatus-Safa has recently been edited, revised, and re-published in 2014, hardcover.

Allegations and refutation of terrorist association
It has been alleged by the U.S. Government  that he is associated with the terrorist organization Jamaat ul-Fuqra. In response to the allegations, Sheikh Gillani has written "In regard to the name, they say MOA is a front for Jamaat al Fuqra. They try to keep bringing this name Jamaat al Fuqra, but we don’t acknowledge it. Can our enemies show me, in my own writing, where I said I established Jamaat al Fuqra or its offices here in Pakistan or in America?" ... "None ever called themselves Jamaat ul Fuqra" In a 2002 interview, Gilani said that he believed the genies to be a greater danger to America than terrorism:Human beings can be made to do things against their will. They can be made to commit crimes. They can made to go and kill people. You know? And all your missiles, all your rockets, space ships go up. And electronics, they can be damaged, influenced, and misdirected through the agencies of jinn beings.

Daniel Pearl
Daniel Pearl was on his way to interview Gilani when he was abducted, although the meeting is believed to have been a set up. Pearl wanted to interview him regarding a fabricated connection between Gilani and the "Shoe Bomber" Richard Reid. Gilani was questioned in Pakistan concerning the abduction and approved for extradition to the United States, but subsequently released. The Federal Bureau of Investigation (FBI) also cleared his name of any such involvement. FBI Special Agent Kathy Diskin: "I had the opportunity to sit down and interview with Sheikh Gilani. And when 15 minutes went into the interview, our feelings were that Sheikh Gilani was not involved in this".

Later life
Gilani returned to Pakistan and was seen as a healer by some. Upon his death in 2021 from a stroke and underlying health conditions, he was survived by eight sons, three daughters and two wives.

References

External links

1937 births
2021 deaths
Pakistani Sufis
Pakistani Sufi religious leaders
Qadiri order
People from Lahore
American Muslims
American Sunni Muslims